Campiglossa aesia is a species of tephritid or fruit flies in the genus Campiglossa of the family Tephritidae.

Distribution
The species is found in the Galápagos Islands.

References

Tephritinae
Insects described in 1849
Diptera of South America
Taxa named by Francis Walker (entomologist)